Waluj MIDC
After 1960, Maharashtra Industrial Development Corporation (MIDC) began acquiring land and setting up industrial estates. Land was acquired near Waluj Village on Chhatrapati Sambhajinagar - Ahmednagar (Ahilya Nagar ) highway in the 1970s & 1980s.
Total notified area is 1298 hectares (12.98 km2).

Clients
Industries which have made Waluj their home include Bajaj Auto, Varroc polymers pvt ltd, Endurance Group, Marathwada Auto Cluster, Mylan Pharmaceuticals, Endress+Hauser, Can Pack Group, Cosmo Films Group, Garware Polymer, BKT Tires, Goodyear Tires, Star Light India Ltd, Coca-Cola, Jonshan & Jonshan, Biral Group, Crompton Graves, Wockhardt, Ajantha Pharma Colgate-Palmolive, Kesona polymats, Siemens, Baxter International, and MAN Diesel, [https://jsdl.in/DT-99M1DNVK Carlsberg India, foster India Ltd, ABInBev Ltd, United Breweries Ltd Kingfisher, Carlsberg India Ltd, Ajanta Brewery Pvt Ltd, Lilasons Pvt Ltd.
Aurangabad is now a classic example of efforts of state government towards balanced industrialisation of state.

Waluj Mahanagar
A new industrial cum residential township has been planned at Waluj in Chhatrapati Sambhajinagar  by CIDCO. It is 12  km southwest of Chhatrapati Sambhajinagar  city and is well connected by road to the city. The new town is named as Waluj Mahanagar.

New Town
This project is approximately eight times the size of those executed in Chhatrapati Sambhajinagar  city. CIDCO has conceived Waluj as a ring township, with the ring route acting as a spine for urban activities around the industrial center (MIDC), with independent and inter-linked nagars spread all around the core with their strong links between workplaces and residences. The ring routes also facilitate an easy and economic transportation system to operate within the new city.
Development of Waluj is encouraged through the development of core units, boosting socio-economic development of the urban fabric. The township, when fully developed, will cover an area of around 100 km2.

External links
Map of Waluj Aurangabad

References

Economy of Aurangabad, Maharashtra
Aurangabad district, Maharashtra
Industrial parks in India
Year of establishment missing